Bellium nivale is a species of daisy in the genus Bellium. They are native to Corsica in South Europe.

References 

Plants described in 1825
Flora of Corsica
Astereae